This page lists Japan-related articles with romanized titles beginning with the letters Y–Z. For names of people, please list by surname (i.e., "Tarō Yamada" should be listed under "Y", not "T"). Please also ignore particles (e.g. "a", "an", "the") when listing articles (i.e., "A City with No People" should be listed under "City").

Ya
Yabakei, Ōita
Yabe, Fukuoka
Yabe, Kumamoto
Yachimata, Chiba
Yachiyo, Chiba
Yachiyo, Hyōgo
Yaeyama District, Okinawa
Yagi, Kyoto
Yagi antenna
Yagi Jūkichi
Yagyū Jūbei Mitsuyoshi
Yagyū Munenori
Yaita, Tochigi
Yaizu, Shizuoka
Yakage, Okayama
Yakiniku
Yakisoba
Yakitori
Yaksha
Yaku, Kagoshima
Yakushima
Yakumo, Shimane
Yakuno, Kyoto
Yakushima White Pine
Kōji Yakusho
Yakult
Yakuza
Yakuza (video game)
Yakuza film
Yalta Conference
Yama-uba
Yamabe District, Nara
Yamada, Fukuoka
Yamada, Miyazaki
Yoji Yamada
Yamae, Kumamoto
Yamaga, Kumamoto
Yamaga, Ōita
Yamagata, Gifu
Yamagata, Iwate
Yamagata, Nagano
Yamagata, Yamagata
Yamagata Aritomo
Yamagata District, Hiroshima
Hiro Yamagata
Yamagata Prefecture
Yamagawa, Kagoshima
Yamaguchi Prefecture
Yamaguchi, Yamaguchi
Yamaguchi-gumi
Kappei Yamaguchi
Kristi Yamaguchi
Makoto Yamaguchi
Yamaha Corporation
Yamaha DSP-1
Yamaha DX7
Yamaha Motor Company
Yamaha YM2149
Yamaha YM3812
Yamaichi Securities
Mika Yamaji
Yamakawa, Fukuoka
Yamakawa, Tokushima
Yamakuni, Ōita
Yamamoto Gonnohyōe
Isoroku Yamamoto
Yamamoto Tsunetomo
Yamamoto, Kagawa
Bochō Yamamura
Sadao Yamanaka
Yamanashi, Yamanashi
Yamanashi Prefecture
Michiru Yamane
Yamanote Line
Yamanokuchi, Miyazaki
Yamaoka, Gifu
Yamasaki, Hyōgo
Minoru Yamasaki
Yamashiro, Kyoto
Yamashiro, Tokushima
Yamashiro Province
Tomoyuki Yamashita
Yamashita's gold
Yamata no Orochi
Yamataka Eye
Yamate
Yamate, Okayama
Yamato, Fukuoka
Yamato, Fukushima
Yamato, Gifu
Yamato, Ibaraki
Yamato, Kagoshima
Yamato, Kanagawa
Yamato, Niigata
Yamato, Saga
Yamato, Yamaguchi
Yamato, Yamanashi
Yamato 1
Yamato-class battleship
Yamato District, Fukuoka
Yamato people
Yamato period
Yamato Takeru
Yamato Province
Yamato Transport
Waki Yamato
Yamatokoriyama, Nara
Yamatoji Line
Yamatotakada, Nara
Yamauchi, Saga
Yamauchi, Shunyo
Hiroshi Yamauchi
Yamazaki Maso
Naoko Yamazaki
Tsutomu Yamazaki
Yamazoe, Nara
Yame District, Fukuoka
Yame, Fukuoka
Yamcha
Yami to Bōshi to Hon no Tabibito
Yanadani, Ehime
Yanagawa, Fukuoka
Kunio Yanagita
Yanahara, Okayama
Yanai, Yamaguchi
Masaru Yanagisawa
Shinsaku Yanai
Yanaizu, Gifu
Akiko Yano
Yao, Osaka
Yao Airport
Yaohan
Yaoi
Yaotsu, Gifu
Yari
Yasaka, Shimane
Yashio, Saitama
Yashiro, Hyōgo
Miyagawa Yashukichi
Yasu District, Shiga
Yasu, Fukuoka
Yasu, Kōchi
Yasu, Shiga
Yasuda, Kōchi
Yasugi, Shimane
Nakaji Yasui
Yasukuni Shrine
Yasutomi, Hyōgo
Yasuura, Hiroshima
Yatomi, Aichi
Yatsuka District, Shimane
Yatsuka, Okayama
Yatsuka, Shimane
Yatsushiro District, Kumamoto
Yatsushiro, Kumamoto
Yawara, Ibaraki
Yawata, Kyoto
Yawatahama, Ehime
Yayoi, Ōita
Yayoi, Tokyo
Yayoi period
Ai Yazawa
Yazu District, Tottori

Ye
Yellow Magic Orchestra

Yk
YKK Group

Yo
Yobuko, Saga
Yodo River
Yodoe, Tottori
Yodoya Saburōemon
Yogo, Shiga
Yojimbo (film)
Yokaichi, Shiga
Yōkaichiba, Chiba
Yokawa, Hyōgo
Yokkaichi, Mie
Yokogawa, Kagoshima
Yokohama F. Marinos
Yokohama National University
Yokohama Municipal Subway
Yokohama, Kanagawa
Gunpei Yokoi
Shoichi Yokoi
Yokoi Shonan
Riichi Yokomitsu
Yokoshima, Kumamoto
Yokosuka D4Y
Yokosuka MXY8
Yokosuka MXY9
Yokosuka, Kanagawa
Yokota Air Base
Yokota, Shimane
Yokote, Akita
Yomi
Yomitan, Okinawa
Yomiuri Giants
Yomiuri Shimbun
Yonabaru, Okinawa
Yonago, Tottori
Yonaguni, Okinawa
Mitsumasa Yonai
Yonashiro, Okinawa
Yoneda lemma
Yonezawa, Yamagata
Yonōzu, Ōita
Odai Yorisada
Yorishima, Okayama
Yoriyuki Arima
Yoro District, Gifu
Yōrō, Gifu
Yoron, Kagoshima
Yosa District, Kyoto
Yosano Akiko
Yoshi
Yoshi (video game)
Yoshi's Cookie
Yoshi's Island
Yoshi's Safari
Yoshida, Ehime
Yoshida, Kagoshima
Yoshida, Shimane
Yoshida, Shizuoka
Mitsuru Yoshida
Shigeru Yoshida
Yoshida Shōin
Jiro Yoshihara
Yoshii, Fukuoka
Yoshii, Gunma
Yoshii, Nagasaki
Yoshii, Okayama (Akaiwa)
Yoshii, Okayama (Shitsuki)
Yoshii Isamu
Yoshijirō Umezu
Yoshikawa, Kōchi
Yoshikawa, Saitama
Eiji Yoshikawa
Takeo Yoshikawa
Yoshiki District, Gifu
Yoshiki District, Yamaguchi
Yoshimatsu, Kagoshima
Yoshimichi Hara
Banana Yoshimoto
Yoshinaga, Okayama
Yoshino, Nara
Yoshino, Tokushima
Yoshino District, Nara
Yoshino Province
Sakuzō Yoshino
Yoshinogen
Yoshinoya
Yoshitomi, Fukuoka
Yoshitoshi
Yoshiumi, Ehime
Yoshiwara
Eisuke Yoshiyuki
Yoshokai
Yotsuba&!
Yotsukaidō, Chiba
You're Under Arrest (manga)
Yōkai
Yoyogi Station

Ys
Ys (Video Game Series)

Yu
Yu-Gi-Oh!
Yuasa, Wakayama
Yubara, Okayama
Yūbari, Hokkaidō
Yufuin, Ōita
Yuge, Ehime
Yui, Shizuoka
Yukata
Hideki Yukawa
Yukawa potential
Yūki, Ibaraki
Yuki, Hiroshima (Jinseki)
Yuki, Hiroshima (Saeki)
Yuki, Tokushima
Yuki-onna
Keiko Yukimura
Satsuki Yukino
Isao Yukisada
Yukuhashi, Fukuoka
Yume de Aetara (manga)
Yume de Aetara (song)
Yumeno Kyūsaku
Yumesaki, Hyōgo
Yumi
Yunokawa Onsen (Hokkaido)
Yunomae, Kumamoto
Yunotsu, Shimane
Yura, Wakayama
Yūrakuchō Station
Yūrei
Yuri (genre)
Yurikamome
Yusuhara, Kōchi
Yutaka, Hiroshima
Yuto, Shizuoka
Yuu, Yamaguchi
Yuya, Yamaguchi
Yuyama
YuYu Hakusho
Yuzawa, Akita
Yuzawa, Niigata

Z
Zaibatsu
Camp Zama
Zama, Kanagawa
Zamami, Okinawa
Zanbatō
Zangief
Zapdos
Zarigani
Zaru
Zazen
Zeebra
Zelda II: The Adventure of Link
Zen
Zen Teacher/Zen Master
Zendo
Zeni
Zengakuren
Zentsūji, Kagawa
Zeon
Zero Wing
Zeta Gundam
Zoids
Zone (band)
Zōri
Zhu Bajie
Zuntata
Zushi, Kanagawa

Y